Atypichthys strigatus, commonly known as the mado, is a species of fish in the family Kyphosidae. This fish is endemic to Eastern Australia.

Description
This species grows to ~20 cm. It has a silver body with dark brown to black stripes, and yellow fins.

Distribution
The mado is endemic to Australia.

Behaviour
A. strigatus forms large schools.

Habitat
A. strigatus are benthic coastal reef inhabitants and are commonly found on reef and under made structures such as wharfs, in depths of 0–55 m.

Diet

A. strigatus are omnivorous.  The A. strigatus primarily feed on zooplankton.

References

Fish of Australia
strigatus
Fish described in 1860
Taxa named by Albert Günther